Spurrell's free-tailed bat (Mops spurrelli) is a species of bat in the family Molossidae named after Herbert George Flaxman Spurrell. It is found in Central and West Africa. Its natural habitats are subtropical or tropical dry forest and subtropical or tropical moist lowland forest.

Taxonomy and etymology
It was described as a new species in 1911 by British zoologist Guy Dollman. Dollman initially placed it in the now-defunct genus Xiphonycteris. The eponym for the species name "spurrelli" is Herbert George Flaxman Spurrell, who collected the holotype.

Description
Its fur is a rusty red color on its back, with its ventral surface a buffy white. It has triangular ears, small feet, and hairy toes.

Range and habitat
Its range includes several countries; it has been documented in Cameroon, Central African Republic, The Democratic Republic of the Congo, Ivory Coast, Equatorial Guinea, Ghana, Guinea, Liberia, Sierra Leone, and Togo

Conservation
As of 2017, it is evaluated as a least-concern species by the IUCN.

References

External links
Images and a range map of this species

Mops (bat)
Taxonomy articles created by Polbot
Mammals described in 1911
Taxa named by Guy Dollman
Bats of Africa